Mesropavan is a historical village in Goghtn Region of Armenia, currently included into Ordubad region of Nakhchivan autonomy of Azerbaijan.

Name
Mesropavan is named after Mesrop Mashtots, founder of the Armenian Alphabet, who lived in the village for years in the 5th century.

History
The region has numerous caves with interesting petroglyphs. Also there are remains of numerous old-age buildings and a monastery, where Mesrop Mashtots preached, build in 456 AD.

Populated places in Ordubad District